Saint-François Airport  is an airport serving Saint-François, a town at the southeastern tip of Grande Terre island in Guadeloupe.

See also

Transport in Guadeloupe
List of airports in Guadeloupe

References

External links
OpenStreetMap - Saint-François
OurAirports - Saint-François
SkyVector - Saint-François

Airports in Guadeloupe